Sir Charles Alban Young, 9th Baronet  (18 November 1865 – 2 March 1944) was a British diplomat.

Biography
Young was the son of Sir Charles Lawrence Young, 7th Baronet, and Mary Florence Toulmin. He entered Her Majesty's Diplomatic Service, serving in Athens and becoming the British Councillor in Tehran in 1910, serving there until 1913. He was then appointed Minister to Guatemala and other countries in Central America between 1913 and 1919. His final posting was as Minister to Serbia from 1919 to 1925. Young inherited his brother's baronetcy in 1921. He was invested as a Knight Commander of the Order of St Michael and St George and as a Member of the Royal Victorian Order.

He married Clara Elliot, daughter of Sir Francis Elliot, on 18 July 1908. His only son, William, was killed in Libya during the Second World War and Young was succeeded in the baronetcy by his grandson.

References

Additional source
Young, Sir (Charles) Alban, Who Was Who, A & C Black, 1920–2014; online edn, Oxford University Press, April 2014

External links

1865 births
1944 deaths
Knights Commander of the Order of St Michael and St George
Members of the Royal Victorian Order
Ambassadors of the United Kingdom to Serbia
Ambassadors of the United Kingdom to Guatemala
Baronets in the Baronetage of Great Britain